Harrison Township is one of twelve townships in Delaware County, Indiana. According to the 2020 census, its population was 3,463 and it contained 1,462 housing units.

History
The Job Garner-Jacob W. Miller House was listed on the National Register of Historic Places in 1986.

Geography
Emerald Lake is in this township.

Cities and towns
 Muncie, northwest edge

Unincorporated towns
 Bethel

Adjacent townships
 Washington Township (north)
 Union Township (northeast)
 Hamilton Township (east)
 Center Township (southeast)
 Mount Pleasant Township (south)
 Richland Township, Madison County (southwest)
 Monroe Township, Madison County (west)
 Van Buren Township, Madison County (northwest)

Major highways
  Interstate 69
  U.S. Route 35
  State Road 28
  State Road 332

Cemeteries
The township contains three cemeteries, Hinton and Nottingham.

Demographics

2020 census
As of the census of 2020,  there were 3,463 people, 1,312 households, and 646 families living in the township. The racial makeup of the township was 94.4% White, 9.8% African American, 6.4% Asian, 7.2% from other races, and 3.1% from two or more races. Hispanic or Latino of any race were 2.1% of the population.

There were 1,312 households, of which 28.6% had children under the age of 18 living with them, 49.2% were married couples living together, 9.1% had a female householder with no husband present,  3.8% had a male householder with no wife present, and 37.9% were non-families. 12.9% of all households were made up of individuals. The average household size was 2.64 and the average family size was 3.18.

21.5% of the population had never been married. 59.2% of residents were married and not separated, 9.3% were widowed, 10.0% were divorced, and 0.0% were separated.

The median age in the township was 38.9. 12.1% of residents were under the age of 5; 28.6% of residents were under the age of 18; 71.4% were age 18 or older; and 24.8% were age 65 or older. 6.4% of the population were veterans.

The most common language spoken at home was English with 98.4% speaking it at home, 0.5% spoke Spanish at home, 0.9% spoke another Indo-European language at home, and 0.2% spoke some other language. 1.4% of the population were foreign born.

The median household income in Harrison Township was $71,164, 26.7% greater than the median average for the state of Indiana. 13.2% of the population were in poverty, including 21.0% of residents under the age of 18.

References
 
 United States Census Bureau cartographic boundary files

External links
 Indiana Township Association
 United Township Association of Indiana

Townships in Delaware County, Indiana
Townships in Indiana